Nana-Grébizi is one of the 16 prefectures of the Central African Republic. It covers an area of 19,996 km and has a population of 87,341 (2003 census). The capital is Kaga Bandoro.

References

Central African Republic at GeoHive

 
Prefectures of the Central African Republic